Underage Thinking is the debut album by singer-songwriter Teddy Geiger, released on March 21, 2006. Geiger wrote or co-wrote all the songs featured on the album herself, as well as a cover of Avion's "Seven Days Without You".

Album information
The album was produced by Billy Mann, Christopher Rojas and Paul Pimsler.

In its first week in the charts, the album sold over 56,500 copies, enough to debut at number eight (#8) in the Billboard 200. The album has sold 360,000+ copies, and is yet to be certified.  The first single released from the album, "For You I Will (Confidence)", which also appears on Geiger's Step Ladder EP as just "Confidence", has been certified platinum according to Billboard.com.

A Japanese edition of the album was released on July 19, 2006, including the two bonus tracks "Do You Even Care" and "Hallelujah".

Geiger re-released the album on October 10, 2006. The special edition with second title 'Look Where We Are Now' includes a bonus DVD that includes the making of and final cuts for the music videos "For You I Will (Confidence)" and "These Walls". A home video of Teddy Geiger and a photo scrapbook are also featured on the DVD. The special edition includes remixes of Geiger's latest singles, a newly recorded track, and some never-before-heard demos that she made before her mainstream success with Underage Thinking. The audio portion of the re-release is available on iTunes and Napster along with the exclusive bonus track "Amazingly Fat Cows", one of the first songs Teddy recorded.

The song "Gentlemen" featured in the film Aquamarine (2006).

Singles
"For You I Will (Confidence)" is the first single from Underage Thinking. The song was released on September 6, 2005. Later, the song was released as a CD single on June 27, 2006. The song can also be found on her 2005 EP Step Ladder under the name "Confidence". The single version has more rock music influences. The single was certified platinum by RIAA on April 13, 2006.
"These Walls" is Teddy Geiger's second single from her debut album. The single was released in September 2006 in the US. The song was less successful than "For You I Will".

Track listings

Standard album

Japanese bonus tracks

Special edition
CD part

DVD part
"For You I Will (Confidence)" (video)
"For You I Will (Confidence)" (making of video)
"For You I Will (Confidence)" (live video)
"These Walls" (video)
"These Walls" (making of video)
A Day in the Life of Teddy Geiger
Home videos
Photo scrapbook

Only tracks 14 and 15 and the hidden track were included on the Australian edition of the 'Look Where We Are Now' CD/DVD. This release also differs from the American one in that it is subtitled 'Australian Tour Signature Edition' and comes with Teddy's signature printed on the cover.

Personnel
Billy Mann – bass, guitar, percussion, piano, arrangement, programming, background vocals, production, engineering, executive production
Adam Ayan – mastering
Christopher Rojas – bass, guitar, piano, arrangement, programming, production, engineering
Teddy Geiger – bass, guitar, percussion, piano, arrangement, programming, vocals, illustrations
Torre Catalano – production coordination
Stephen Danelian – cover photo
Lana Israel – production coordination
Lee Levin – drums
Maria Paula Marulanda – art direction
Daniel Moss – photography
Keith Naftaly – A&R
Paul Pimsler – guitar, production
Gabrielle Revere – photography
Dan Warner – guitar
Andy Zulla – mixing

Charts

1: It is unclear if this is the peak position. The official debut position of the album on the Canadian Albums Chart is not known.

References

2006 debut albums
Teddy Geiger albums
Columbia Records albums